The Barefooted Flight («Ақтабан шұбырынды, Алқакөл сұлама ) is a name given to the catastrophic defeat and ensuing relocation of the Kazakhs from some southern areas of Kazakhstan in 1722 or 1723. The relocation included members of the Senior Horde, Middle Horde, and Junior Horde, as well as members of the Kyrgyz and Karakalpaks. The degree of starvation and loss of life is open to historical debate, but the after effects are documented among the sedentary neighbors of the Kazakhs. In short, the Barefooted Flight created a "worst case of nomadic-sedentary relations: steppe pastoralists ravaged the cultivated land of sedentary neighbours."

Historical background
The period from the middle of the 17th century to the early 18th century in what is today eastern Kazakhstan and northwestern China saw the rise of the Oirats, including what later became known as the Zunghar Khanate. This state was, in the opinion of Peter Perdue, the last great steppe empire, at least the last steppe state with serious aspirations of empire. The Zunghar Khanate expanded at the expense of the Kazakh Khanate in the west, though this also meant the inclusion of the Senior Horde into the Zunghar Khanate.

The historian Barthold argued that only after Galdan Boshugtu Khan, the Khong Tayiji of the Zunghars, had successfully conquered and destroyed the power of Sayram did he move his encampment west to the valley of the Ili, ensuring his control of Zhetysu east of Sayram. Galdan sent forces against Sayram in 1681, which must have been unsuccessful because they returned in 1683, when Barthold tells us that his commander Rabtan (probably Tsewang Rabtan took the city and razed it.

Sayram was slowly rebuilt, likely with the support of the merchants of Central Asia and the leadership of the Kazakhs. This knowledge comes from the fact that the city appears again as a target of Zunghar aggression forty years later.

The Barefooted Flight
In 1723, a detachment of Oirats attacked deep into territory previously controlled by the Kazakhs, including the cities of Sayram, Turkistān, and Tashkent, which passed under their control and remained Zunghar possessions until their destruction by the Chinese in 1758.

In National History
The Kazakh political activist and historian Mukhamedzhan Tynyshpaev wrote several works which described the Flight. His narrative of the events would later form the basis of Soviet-era and Post-Soviet histories of the event.

References

1720s in Asia
Kazakh Khanate
Dzungar Khanate
1722 in Asia 
1723 in Asia